Camarillasaurus (meaning "Camarillas lizard") is a genus of spinosaurid dinosaur from the Early Cretaceous period (Barremian) of Camarillas, Teruel Province, in what is now northeastern Spain. Described in 2014, it was originally identified as a ceratosaurian theropod, before being referred to the Spinosauridae in 2021.

History of research

Fossils of Camarillasaurus were discovered in the Camarillas Formation. The type species, Camarillasaurus cirugedae, was described by palaeontologists Bárbara Sánchez-Hernández and Michael J. Benton. The describers considered it to be a basal ceratosaur, somewhat unusual given its young age. However, in an abstract given at the EAVP 2019 conference, Oliver Rauhut and colleagues suggested it is a member of the Spinosauridae rather than a ceratosaur, based on characters of the posterior caudal vertebrae and newly excavated material at the type locality; a  chapter of a 2019 dissertation by Adun Samathi concurred with that conclusion. In 2021, the chapter was formally published as a paper, with the same conclusion; Samathi noted similarities with spinosaur material from Thailand and other taxa within the family. Camarillasaurus is one of four spinosaurid taxa known from the Iberian peninsula, the others being Baryonyx, Vallibonavenatrix, and Iberospinus.

References

Early Cretaceous dinosaurs of Europe
Barremian life
Cretaceous Spain
Fossils of Spain
 
Fossil taxa described in 2014
Spinosaurids
Taxa named by Michael Benton